The Tower of Seneca is a ruined Genoese tower located in the commune of Luri in the Cap Corse region of the Corsica.

The tower was built in the 16th century. It was one of a series of defences constructed by the Republic of Genoa between 1530 and 1620 to stem the attacks by Barbary pirates.
 
The tower now belongs to the commune. In 1840 it was added to the official list of the historical monuments of France.

See also
List of Genoese towers in Corsica

References

Towers in Corsica
Monuments historiques of Corsica